Edmund Migoś (1937-2006) was an international speedway rider from Poland.

Speedway career 
Migoś won a gold medal in the Speedway World Team Cup in the 1966 Speedway World Team Cup and two bronze medals in 1968 and 1970.

World final appearances

Individual World Championship
 1970 –  Wrocław, Olympic Stadium – Reserve – 4pts

World Team Cup
 1966 -  Wrocław, Olympic Stadium (with Andrzej Pogorzelski / Andrzej Wyglenda / Antoni Woryna / Marian Rose) - Winner - 41pts - (did not ride)
 1968 -  London, Wembley Stadium (with Edward Jancarz / Paweł Waloszek / Andrzej Wyglenda / Henryk Glücklich) - 3rd - 19pts (8)
 1970 -  London, Wembley Stadium (with Jan Mucha / Paweł Waloszek / Antoni Woryna / Henryk Glücklich) - 3rd - 20pts (4)

References 

1937 births
2006 deaths
Polish speedway riders